The 2013 COSAFA U-20 Cup was the 22nd edition of the COSAFA U-20 Challenge Cup, an international youth competition open to national associations of the COSAFA region. It was the first time since 2011 that the competition took place, as the 2012 event was cancelled while COSAFA concentrated their effort into organising a football competition as part of the Zone Six Games.

Lesotho was the host nation of the competition.  It took place between 3 and 14 December. The host cities were Maseru and Mafeteng.

The competition was open to players born on or after 1 January 1994.

Participants 

The following nations participated:

 (hosts)

Format 

There were four groups where each group was decided on a round-robin base. All four group winners advanced to the semi-final stage.

The draw for the first round group stages took place in Maseru October 11.

Group stage 

The draw took place on 12 October 2013.

Group A

Group B

Group C

Group D

Combined group games

Top scorers
6 goals

 Manuel Afonso

4 goals

 João de Oliveira
 Clesio Baque

2 goals

 Thatayaone Ramatlapeng
 Unobatsha Mbaiwa 
 Siyanda Ngubo
 Nhlakanipho Ntuli 
 Walter Musona

1 goal

 Mavambu Baptista 
 Athouman Alhadhur 
 Enock Agwanda
 John Nairuka 
 Collins Shivaki 
 Geoffrey Shiveka
 Timonah Wanyonyi 
 Tumelo Khutlang 
  Mafa Moremoholo
 Thabo Ntso
 Angelo Andreas 
 Tafadzwa Kutinyu 
 Dercio Matimbe 
 Luís Miquissone 
 Ambrosias Amseb 
 Brandon Goagoseb 
 Terdius Uiseb 
 Dieter Constance 
 Ayabulela Magqwaka
 Mlamuli Nkambule 
 Patson Daka 
 Liberty Chakoroma 
 Norberto Norberto
 Carlos Rusere 
 Tinotenda Kadewere

1 own goal

 Lepolesa Tekane (playing against Comoros)

Knockout stage

Semi finals

Third place playoff

Final

Winners

References

U-20
2013
2013 in Lesotho sport